Leandro dos Santos Branco (born 2 June 1983 in Lages, Santa Catarina) is a Brazilian footballer who plays as a forward for Águia Negra.

Football career
After spending most of his career with modest clubs in his country, Branco moved in 2007–08 to Portugal, signing with Vitória de Setúbal. His stint with the Sado River side proved a nightmare, as he failed to score a single Primeira Liga goal in two seasons combined, also receiving his marching orders in a 1–2 away loss against C.F. Os Belenenses on 11 April 2009; he netted twice in official games during his stint, one in the Portuguese Cup and another in the domestic League Cup, with his team winning the latter competition.

In the 2009 summer, Branco returned to his country, signing with Criciúma. The following year he switched to Metropolitano, and continued playing at that level in the subsequent campaigns, representing for example Marcílio Dias and Tubarão in several stints.

Honours
Vitória de Setúbal
Taça da Liga: 2007–08

References

External links

1983 births
Living people
People from Lages
Brazilian footballers
Association football forwards
Campeonato Brasileiro Série B players
Campeonato Brasileiro Série C players
Campeonato Brasileiro Série D players
Associação Chapecoense de Futebol players
Ituano FC players
Grêmio Esportivo Juventus players
Criciúma Esporte Clube players
Clube Atlético Metropolitano players
Esporte Clube Internacional de Lages players
Chilean Primera División players
Audax Italiano footballers
Primeira Liga players
Vitória F.C. players
Brazilian expatriate footballers
Expatriate footballers in Chile
Expatriate footballers in Portugal
Brazilian expatriate sportspeople in Portugal
Sportspeople from Santa Catarina (state)